The Right Stuff is an American historical drama streaming television series, loosely based on the 1979 book of the same name by Tom Wolfe and its 1983 film adaptation, that premiered on October 9, 2020, on Disney+. It explores the origins and growth of the United States' space program. On April 3, 2021, Disney+ canceled the series due to a redesign in the NatGeo channel's focus. Show financier Warner Bros. Television is looking to shop the series to other networks.

Premise
The Right Stuff takes a "gritty, anti-nostalgic look at what would become America's first reality show as the obsessive original Mercury Seven astronauts and their families become instant celebrities in a competition that will either kill them or make them immortal. The eight-part, one-hour-per-episode drama will follow the protagonists from the Mojave Desert to the edges of space, with future seasons carrying through to humankind’s greatest achievement: the moon landing."

Cast and characters

Main
 Jake McDorman as Alan Shepard
 Patrick J. Adams as John Glenn
 Colin O'Donoghue as Gordon Cooper
 James Lafferty as Scott Carpenter
 Aaron Staton as Wally Schirra
 Michael Trotter as Gus Grissom
 Micah Stock as Deke Slayton
 Eric Ladin as Chris Kraft
 Patrick Fischler as Bob Gilruth
 Nora Zehetner as Annie Glenn
 Eloise Mumford as Trudy Cooper
 Jackson Pace as Glynn Lunney
 Shannon Lucio as Louise Shepard

Recurring
 Sacha Seberg as Wernher Von Braun
 Jordan Woods-Robinson as Mike Turley
 Rachel Burttram as Betty Grissom
 Jade Albany Pietrantonio as Rene Carpenter
 Laura Ault as Jo Schirra
 Chandler Head as Cam Cooper
 Lucy Capri as Janita Cooper
 Taegan Burns as Laura Shepard
 Avery Burns as Julie Shepard
 Kyra Johnson as Lyn Glenn
 David Bolinger as David Glenn
 Victoria White as Marge Slayton
 Christopher Cassarino as Henri Landwirth
 Mamie Gummer as Jerrie Cobb
 Kaley Ronayne as Dee O'Hara
 Josh Cooke as Loudon Wainwright Jr.
 Danny Strong as John A. Powers
 Jordan Blair Mangold Brown as Eunice
 Elizabeth D'Onofrio as Doris

Episodes

Production
On July 25, 2017, it was announced that National Geographic was partnering with Appian Way Productions and Warner Horizon Television to option the screen rights to Tom Wolfe's 1979 novel The Right Stuff. The series was set to be written by Will Staples who was also expected to executive produce alongside Leonardo DiCaprio and Jennifer Davisson.

On February 10, 2019, it was announced during the Television Critics Association's annual winter press tour that National Geographic had given the production a series order. David Nutter was expected to direct the premiere episode. Additional executive producers were set to include Mark Lafferty and Lizzie Mickery with Lafferty also serving as showrunner.

The series premiered on October 9, 2020. On November 20, 2020, the series was granted a tax credit to film a second season in San Diego. The show had yet to be officially renewed at the time. However, on April 3, 2021, it was announced that Disney+ had canceled the series due to a change in NatGeo's programming focus. Show financier Warner Bros. Television is looking to shop the series to other networks such as TNT and HBO Max.

Casting
On May 31, 2019, Patrick J. Adams had been cast in the series lead role of John Glenn. On June 14, 2019, Jake McDorman and Colin O'Donoghue were cast as Alan Shepard and Gordon Cooper, respectively. On June 21, 2019, Eric Ladin, Patrick Fischler, Nora Zehetner, Eloise Mumford, Shannon Lucio, and Josh Cooke joined the cast. On August 19, 2019, Danny Strong was cast as NASA Spokesman John A. "Shorty" Powers. On November 29, 2019, Mamie Gummer was cast as "Mercury 13" astronaut hopeful, Jerrie Cobb.

Reception

Critical response 
On review aggregator website Rotten Tomatoes, the series holds an approval rating of 55% based on 31 reviews, with an average rating of 7.21/10. The site's critics consensus reads: "The Right Stuff contains some grace notes in its depiction of America's first slate of astronauts, but this tired retread of Tom Wolfe's famed book mostly makes the wrong moves in revitalizing space race history for the modern era." On Metacritic, the series has a weighted average score of 61 out of 100, based on 22 critics, indicating "generally favorable reviews".

Richard Roeper of The Chicago Sun-Times praised the show as "a visually striking, well-acted period piece that plays like 'Mad Men: The Flyboys Edition." Writing for Rolling Stone, Alan Sepinwall called the show "a dutiful, mostly competent, infrequently lively historical workplace drama" and "almost defiantly generic in every way." Wall Street Journal reviewer John Anderson described the show as "a perfectly serviceable drama about a rococo period of American history." Lucy Mangan of The Guardian rated the show 4 out of 5 stars and claimed that "The Right Stuff doesn’t reach for the stars, but looks back to the Earth from which the phenomenon of astronauts and space travel, the glamour and the myths grew, along with the appetites they fed, and is all the more interesting for that." Matt Cabral of Common Sense Media rated the series 3 out of 5 stars and called it a "space drama" that is "serviceable but doesn't reach the stars."

In Caroline Framke's review for Variety, she criticized the show as "familiar" and said it "never met a space story cliché it didn't embrace with open arms."  In a review for The Dispatch, Alec Dent criticized the show's choice to leave out Chuck Yeager, saying his absence "embodies the central problem of the show: those behind it don't seem to understand what the right stuff is, at least not well enough to portray it on TV."

Accolades

See also 
 The Right Stuff, 1983 film

References

External links
 

 

2020 American television series debuts
2020 American television series endings
2020s American drama television series
Disney+ original programming
English-language television shows
Science docudramas
Television series by Warner Horizon Television
Television series set in the 1960s
Television series based on adaptations
Television shows based on non-fiction books
Live action television shows based on films
Cultural depictions of Wernher von Braun
Television series about astronauts
Television series based on actual events
Project Mercury
Television series about NASA
Scott Carpenter
Gordon Cooper
John Glenn
Gus Grissom
Wally Schirra
Alan Shepard
Deke Slayton